Laurie Nichols is an American academic administrator serving as the 11th president at Black Hills State University. Nichols previously served as the 27th president of the University of Wyoming.

Early life and education
Nichols was born in Colman, South Dakota. She earned a bachelor of science degree from South Dakota State University in 1978, followed by a master in education from Colorado State University in 1984 and a PhD in family and consumer sciences education from Ohio State University in 1988.

Career
Nichols began her career at the University of Idaho. She was the dean of the College of Education and Human Sciences at South Dakota State University from 1994 to 2008, and interim president of Northern State University from August 2008 to June 2009. She was the provost and executive vice president for academic affairs at South Dakota State University from 2009 to 2016 and then was appointed president of the University of Wyoming in 2016.

Nichols served as the president of the University of Wyoming from May 16, 2016 to June 30, 2019, when she was abruptly fired by the Wyoming Board of Regents. Nichols has been the subject of an ongoing investigation, which found that Nichols had displayed a pattern of verbal abuse during her tenure at the university. She assumed the presidency of Black Hills State University in 2019, initially on an interim basis. Her appointment as president was confirmed by the South Dakota Board of Regents in December 2019.

Personal life
With her husband Tim, Nichols has two daughters.

References

Living people
People from South Dakota
South Dakota State University alumni
Colorado State University alumni
Ohio State University College of Education and Human Ecology alumni
University of Idaho faculty
South Dakota State University faculty
Northern State University faculty
Presidents of the University of Wyoming
Black Hills State University
American women academics
Women heads of universities and colleges
Year of birth missing (living people)
21st-century American women